Hospital Valle Norte is a Spanish medical drama television series that originally aired on La 1 from 14 January to 18 March 2019. The ensemble cast features Alexandra Jiménez and José Luis García Pérez, among others. Produced by RTVE in collaboration with José Frade PC, it was directed by Peris Romano, Juanma Pachón and Marco Castillo.

Premise 
It focuses on both the professional and personal mishaps of the workers of the 'Hospital Valle Norte'. The fiction begins with the arrival of Dr. Paula García to lead the hospital's surgical department, clashing with surgeon Héctor Salgado.

Cast

Production and release 
Hospital Valle Norte was produced by RTVE in collaboration with José Frade PC. The writing team, coordinated by Peris Romano and Xabi Puerta, also featured Ángela Obón, Clara Pérez Escrivá, Ángela Armero, Pablo Barrera, Nico Romero, Bárbara Alpuente, Maite Pérez Astorga, Yaiza Berrocal and Cristina Pons. The 10 episodes were directed by Peris Romano (1, 2, 9 and 10), Juanma Pachón (3, 4, 7 and 8) and Marco Castillo (5 and 6). Shooting began in Madrid towards July 2018. Outdoor shooting locations included Gran Vía, the Calle del Clavel, and the Plaza de Pedro Zerolo in Chueca.
The series was presented at the MiM Series Festival in December 2018.

The series premiered on 14 January 2019 on La 1, earning a 9.5% audience share and 1,552,000 viewers in the first episode. Throughout its broadcasting run, the series ended up averaging an unimpressive 8.1% audience share and 1,297,000 viewers, below the channel's average.

References

External links 
 Hospital Valle Norte on RTVE Play

La 1 (Spanish TV channel) network series
Television shows filmed in Spain
2010s Spanish drama television series
2019 Spanish television series debuts
2019 Spanish television series endings
Spanish-language television shows
Spanish medical television series